Otto Rehhagel (born 9 August 1938) is a German former football coach and player. 

Rehhagel is one of only two people who, as player and manager combined, has participated in over 1,000 Bundesliga matches (the other being Jupp Heynckes). In the Bundesliga, he holds the records for the most victories (387), most draws (205), most losses (228), and his teams have scored the most goals (1,473) and conceded more (1,142) than any other. He served as the trainer of Werder Bremen between 1981 and 1995 and won twice the Bundesliga and in 1992 the UEFA Cup Winners' Cup with them. After a rather unsuccessful intermezzo at Bayern Munich, he won the Bundesliga sensationally with the promoted team 1. FC Kaiserslautern.

Internationally, Rehhagel coached the Greece national team from 2001 to 2010 in the their most successful footballing era – during that period, the Greece won the 2004 European Championship unexpectedly and qualified for the 2010 World Cup, their second World Cup finals appearance. A 2022 critically acclaimed film entitled, King Otto, was made on Otto Rehhagel's triumph with the Greece national team for the 2004 European Championships.

Playing career
Born in Altenessen, Rehhagel began his playing career with local club TuS Helene Altenessen in 1948. He moved to Rot-Weiss Essen (1960–63), after the start of the Bundesliga for Hertha BSC (1963–65), and until 1972 for Kaiserslautern. He played 201 games in the Bundesliga. As a player, Rehhagel was known as a tough-as-nails defender.

Managerial career

Early years
In 1974, he took charge of Kickers Offenbach, but failed to make an immediate impact as a manager. Most famously, while in charge of Borussia Dortmund in 1978, he suffered a historic, record-setting 12–0 loss to Borussia Mönchengladbach, after which the tabloids called him Otto Torhagel ("Tor" means goal in German, and "Hagel" means a hailstorm). In 1980, Rehhagel won his first trophy as a manager, when his Fortuna Düsseldorf side won the German Cup.

Werder Bremen
Rehhagel managed Werder Bremen from 1981 to 1995. During these 14 golden years for the club, Rehhagel transformed Werder from a small minnow into a powerhouse, dazzling spectators with powerful up-tempo play and a smothering defence. During this spell, Werder Bremen established themselves as one of the main teams in the Bundesliga, overtaking hated rivals Hamburg as the top club in the north and sparking an intense feud with Bayern Munich. In the mid-eighties, Rehhagel often fell just short of success and had a string of second places and Cup Final losses. In that time, his nickname was Otto II or Vizeadmiral ("Vice Admiral"). However, Rehhagel led Werder Bremen to two German championships in 1988 and 1993, two DFB-Pokal victories in 1991 and 1994, as well as winning the European Cup Winners' Cup in 1992. In this period, Rehhagel produced a host of international stars, such as Rudi Völler, Karl-Heinz Riedle, Dieter Eilts, Marco Bode, Mario Basler, Hany Ramzy, Andreas Herzog and Rune Bratseth. Rehhagel's Werder Bremen team of 1987–88 was at that time the squad which conceded the fewest goals ever in the Bundesliga (22), this record was surpassed by Bayern Munich in the 2007–08 season with 21 goals. His stint with Werder Bremen (14 years Bundesliga) is the second longest consecutive occupation as a manager ever in the Bundesliga. It was eventually surpassed by Volker Finke of Freiburg (16 years).

Bayern Munich
After 14 golden years at Werder Bremen, Rehhagel left to manage former hated rivals, Bayern Munich, before the start of the 1995–96 season. Prior to Rehhagel's arrival, Bayern had a disappointing, but financially lucrative season in 1994–95 (a very poor sixth place in the Bundesliga, but semi-finals in the Champions League). In the summer of 1995, Bayern spent a lot of money, buying Jürgen Klinsmann, Andreas Herzog, and others, and Rehhagel was brought in as manager to replace Giovanni Trapattoni. It was widely expected that Munich would steamroll the opposition in 1995–96, but from day 1, Rehhagel clashed with the team and the team environment. His single-minded and occasionally eccentric ways did not mesh at all with Bayern, who quickly felt that Rehhagel was too rural at heart and had no clue about how to interact in the fancy environment of Munich. Moreover, Rehhagel's old-school tactics and patronising of the Bayern players caused major antipathy in the Bayern team, especially from Klinsmann, who never missed an opportunity to take shots at Rehhagel. Despite Rehhagel getting Bayern to the UEFA Cup final, Bayern's results in the Bundesliga dropped alarmingly in the second half of the season, and Rehhagel was famously sacked just 4 days before they were due to play in the first leg of the 1996 UEFA Cup final. Rehhagel's job was taken over by Franz Beckenbauer, who led the team to victory in the 1996 UEFA Cup final, and oversaw an upturn in form in the last couple of weeks in the Bundesliga, but Bayern finished second, as Borussia Dortmund won their second German championship in a row.

1. FC Kaiserslautern
After being sacked by Bayern Munich, Rehhagel took over as manager of Kaiserslautern in 1996, after a season where the club had won the DFB-Pokal but had also been relegated from the top-flight following a catastrophic season in the Bundesliga. Rehhagel injected new energy into the team, which saw Kaiserslautern comfortably getting back into the top-flight in 1997, winning the second division by 10 points. Prior to the start of the 1997–98 season, Kaiserslautern were seen as dark horses for a place in the UEFA Cup, but Rehhagel's team simply steamrollered the Bundesliga opposition all season. With sparkling offence and sheer never-ending energy (half a dozen games were won in injury time), Kaiserslautern won a sensational German championship in 1998, the first and so far only German championship triumph by a team that had just been promoted the previous season. Rehhagel coached Kaiserslautern to some less spectacular, but very decent results over the next year, such as leading the team to the quarter finals of the 1998–99 UEFA Champions League, but then big internal conflicts within the club, rows with some players, and a massive smear campaign, caused him to resign his position in 2000. Rehhagel finished with a record of 87 wins, 39 draws, and 48 losses.

Greece national team
In August 2001, following Vassilis Daniil's departure, Rehhagel was appointed as the new manager of the Greece national team, ahead of other candidates, such as Marco Tardelli, Nevio Scala, Vanderlei Luxemburgo, and Terry Venables, who were also being considered for the managerial post. Rehhagel's first match in charge was in October 2001, a 2002 World Cup qualifier against Finland, which ended in a 5–1 away defeat. As a result, he rebuilt the squad, and in October 2003, after a 1–0 win over Northern Ireland, Greece qualified automatically for Euro 2004, ahead of Spain and Ukraine. Ranked 150–1 outsiders, they nevertheless defeated host nation Portugal, holders France and the much more fancied Czech Republic on the way to the final, where they again defeated Portugal 1–0. Rehhagel, who was seen as the man most responsible for the team's success, became the first foreign manager ever to win a European Championship and remains the only one to date. Despite not having a star-studded line-up, the Greek team won the championship, conceding no goals in the knockout stage.

Rehhagel adopted a defensive approach in playing his Greek side, using energetic midfielders to wear down the opponents and the policy of defending in numbers to numb the opposition's attacks. When charged with boring play, he said, "No one should forget that a coach adapts the tactics to the characteristics of the available players." His time at Werder Bremen, in contrast, saw play described as flashy and spectacular attacking football.

After Rudi Völler resigned as Germany coach in the wake of that country's first-round exit in Euro 2004, Rehhagel was considered by many to be a strong candidate for his homeland's job. He had the support of the public, despite being considered a maverick by the footballing establishment. After three other candidates removed themselves from consideration, Rehhagel received an offer to take over as Germany coach, which he officially turned down on 10 July.

In their qualifying group for the 2006 FIFA World Cup, the Greek side failed to make the grade, finishing fourth in a tough group which saw Ukraine advance as group winner and Turkey go on to the play-off. The team returned to success though by qualifying for Euro 2008, ending the qualifying stage with the highest points total of any team and ensuring they would be able to defend their title. On 30 March 2008, Rehhagel extended his contract with Greece until 2010. The Euro 2008 ended in disappointment after three group stage losses against Sweden, Russia, and eventual winners Spain.

For the 2010 FIFA World Cup qualifying group and having finished second in group Two behind Switzerland, coach Rehhagel and the national team met Ukraine in a two-legged play-off and won 1–0 in Donetsk after a 0–0 draw in Piraeus, with Dimitris Salpingidis getting the winner. The success against Ukraine allowed the Greek squad to compete in the 2010 FIFA World Cup held in South Africa and solidified the position of Otto Rehhagel as one of the most important people in the history of Greek sport. At the age of 71, he also became the oldest national team manager to coach in a FIFA World Cup, surpassing Cesare Maldini's record from 2002.
Greece lost to South Korea, Argentina, defeated Nigeria 2–1 and exited the FIFA World Cup in the group stage, despite Salpingidis scoring Greek's first ever goal in a World Cup against Nigeria. Rehhagel announced his wish to leave his coaching position after the World Cup. On 23 June 2010, he announced his resignation from Greece.

The 2021 documentary King Otto by New York-based director Christopher André Marks chronicles Rehhagel's success in Greece. The film's opening line quotes the first line of Homer's Odyssey, "Tell me, O muse, of that ingenious hero who travelled far and wide".

Hertha BSC

Rehhagel signed for ailing Bundesliga club Hertha BSC and was manager of the club between 18 February 2012 and 30 June 2012. His attempt to save Hertha from relegation however ended in a failure, after the Berliners were defeated by 2. Bundesliga club Fortuna Düsseldorf in a two-legged playoff. Rehhagel finished with a record of three wins, three draws, and eight losses.

Coaching style
Rehhagel popularized the phrase kontrollierte Offensive (controlled offence). He prefers a grass-roots approach to football, stressing the importance of at least two (often also three) big, strong headers in central defence. His defensive schemes often use a dominant libero, such as Rune Bratseth, Miroslav Kadlec, or Traianos Dellas. In defence, Rehhagel usually prefers robustness and height over footballing abilities (the most notorious example being Ulrich Borowka). In the period of all-round, fluid defence, many have criticized this as dated and anachronistic, but Rehhagel replied that his success makes him right.

Rehhagel's teams regularly develop pressure on the wings complemented with at least one dominant header as the central striker. Examples include Mario Basler/Marco Bode playing on the wings at Bremen or Andreas Buck/Marco Reich at Kaiserslautern while (Rudi Völler, Karl-Heinz Riedle, Frank Neubarth, Olaf Marschall, and Angelos Charisteas) at the top of the formation.

The backbone of his teams are usually older, more experienced players while younger talents rarely find themselves taking responsibility. At Kaiserslautern, Rehhagel often kept the young Michael Ballack on the bench as a substitute. Despite this, he is also known for being an excellent talent scout, having discovered Völler, Riedle, Marco Bode, Dieter Eilts, Marco Reich, Miroslav Klose, Angelos Charisteas, Sotiris Kyrgiakos, Theofanis Gekas and many others.

With Greece he used man-marking, which was an unusual tactical throwback at the time, meaning their opponents were unprepared to combat it.

Rehhagel is also known for being a good motivator. His teams possess a lot of team spirit, most famously the Greece national team, which he turned from a dead-end squad nobody wanted to play for into a must-be-there-at-all-costs team. He is also famous for reigniting the careers of older players, such as Manfred Burgsmüller, Mirko Votava, Olaf Marschall or Theodoros Zagorakis.

Rehhagel is also a deft and ruthless club politician. He is notorious for restructuring clubs by making friends with powerful people and using them to eliminate the opposition in order to wield absolute power, preferring the system of a benign dictatorship. His way of handling a club – in a competent and innovative, but also highly patronizing and condescending way – has been immortalized as ottocracy, a pun on his name alluding to the style of management/government; autocracy.

Finally, Rehhagel is considered somewhat of a maverick in Germany. In decades of interviews, he has established a reputation for being eccentric, arrogant and unwilling to admit mistakes, similar to e.g. José Mourinho and Brian Clough. However, seeing his impressive record, he is apparently able to back up his words.

Famous players associated with Rehhagel include Klaus Allofs, Mario Basler, Marco Bode, Rune Bratseth, Manfred Burgsmüller, Theofanis Gekas, Angelos Charisteas, Traianos Dellas, Dieter Eilts, Andreas Herzog, Marian Hristov, Miroslav Klose, Olaf Marschall, Hany Ramzy, Karl-Heinz Riedle, Wynton Rufer, Thomas Schaaf, Ciriaco Sforza, Rudi Völler, Theodoros Zagorakis, Andreas Brehme and Michael Ballack.

Personal life

Rehhagel is married to Beate Rehhagel from Steele, Essen since 1963. They have one child, Jens Rehhagel, who has played football at semi-professional level.

Rehhagel likes to call himself Kind der Bundesliga ("Child of the Bundesliga"), having played in the very first Bundesliga game, and spent his club career there, with nine teams. In Greece, he is occasionally called King Otto (βασιλιάς Όθων), probably in allusion to King Otto of Greece from Bavaria, however he already had this nickname during his coaching career in Germany. As a pun referring to Herakles, son of Zeus, he has been nicknamed "Rehakles" as well. Rehhagel is an honorary citizen of Athens.

Career statistics

Honours

Managerial honours

Fortuna Düsseldorf
 DFB-Pokal: 1979–80

Werder Bremen
 Bundesliga: 1987–88, 1992–93
 DFB-Pokal: 1990–91, 1993–94
 DFL-Supercup: 1988, 1993, 1994
 UEFA Cup Winners' Cup: 1991–92

1. FC Kaiserslautern
 Bundesliga: 1997–98
 2. Bundesliga: 1996–97

Greece
 UEFA European Championship: 2004

Individual
 Order of the Phoenix of the Hellenic Republic: (2005)
 Laureus World Sports Awards with the Greece national football team: (2005)
 "Greece's Coach of the Year" (2004, 2007), first-ever foreigner to win this award
 European Coach of the Year—Alf Ramsey Award: 2004
 IFFHS World's Best National Coach: 2004
 World Soccer 36th Greatest Manager of All Time: 2013
 France Football 46th Greatest Manager of All Time: 2019

References

External links

 
 , by DJ Ötzi

1938 births
Living people
Footballers from Essen
German footballers
Rot-Weiss Essen players
Hertha BSC players
1. FC Kaiserslautern players
German football managers
Kickers Offenbach managers
1. FC Saarbrücken managers
Arminia Bielefeld managers
Fortuna Düsseldorf managers
Borussia Dortmund managers
SV Werder Bremen managers
FC Bayern Munich managers
1. FC Kaiserslautern managers
Hertha BSC managers
Greece national football team managers
UEFA Euro 2004 managers
2005 FIFA Confederations Cup managers
UEFA Euro 2008 managers
UEFA European Championship-winning managers
2010 FIFA World Cup managers
Bundesliga managers
Officers Crosses of the Order of Merit of the Federal Republic of Germany
German expatriate football managers
Expatriate football managers in Greece
Bundesliga players
2. Bundesliga managers
Association football defenders
West German footballers
West German football managers